This article details the qualifying phase for boxing at the 2024 Summer Olympics.  The competition at these Games comprises a total of 248 boxers coming from the different NOCs, about forty fewer overall than those in Tokyo 2020. Each NOC could only send a single boxer in each of the thirteen weight categories (seven for men and six for women).

In June 2022, the International Olympic Committee (IOC) barred the International Boxing Association's (IBA) rights to run and organize the tournament due to "continuing irregularity issues in the areas of finance, governance, ethics, refereeing, and judging". Hence, the IOC executive board established and ratified a new qualification system for Paris 2024 that would witness the boxers obtain the quota spots through the continental multisport events, reducing the complexity of the process.

The qualification period commences at five regional multisport events in the middle of the 2023 season (African Games in Accra, Ghana; Asian Games in Hangzhou, China; European Games in Kraków, Poland; Pacific Games in Honiara, Solomon Islands; and the Pan American Games in Santiago, Chile), set to be served as continental qualifying meets, where a total of 139 spots will be assigned to a specific number of highest-ranked boxers in each weight category. Following the continental phase, the remainder of the total quota will be decided in two world qualification tournaments organized by the IOC in the initial half of the 2024 season, offering another batch of spots available to the highest-ranked eligible boxers in each weight division.

The host nation France reserves a maximum of six quota places to be equally distributed between men and women in their respective weight categories, while nine places (four for men and five for women) will be entitled to eligible NOCs interested to have their boxers compete in Paris 2024 as abided by the Universality principle.

Timeline

Qualification summary

Men's events

Flyweight (51 kg)

Featherweight (57 kg)

Lightweight (63.5 kg)

Welterweight (71 kg)

Middleweight (80 kg)

Heavyweight (92 kg)

Super heavyweight (+92 kg)

Women's events

Flyweight (50 kg)

Bantamweight (54 kg)

Featherweight (57 kg)

Lightweight (60 kg)

Welterweight (66 kg)

Middleweight (75 kg)

References

 
Qualification